DZRH (666 AM) is a radio station owned and operated by Manila Broadcasting Company, which serves as the flagship station. The station's studio is located at the MBC Building, Star City, Vicente Sotto St., CCP Complex, Roxas Boulevard, Pasay; while its transmitter is located along I. Marcelo St., Brgy. Malanday, Valenzuela. The station has nationwide coverage through its relay stations located across the Philippines.

Established on July 15, 1939, DZRH is the oldest private radio station, and the second oldest radio station in the Philippines, after the government-owned DZRB.

History

The Heacock era
DZRH first went on air as KZRH on July 15, 1939, after being founded by Samuel Gaches, the owner of H. E. Heacock Company, a department store based in Escolta, Binondo, Manila, with Hal Bowie as the station's first announcer. KZRH, which was broadcasting using the frequency of 650 kHz with the power of 10,000 watts; and became the fourth commercial radio station in the Philippines. Later in 1940, it bought KZRC (now DYRC) from Isaac Beck in Cebu City. KZRH's radio broadcasts centered on musical, variety shows, comedy skits and short newscasts. Jazz and ballads became standard fare. At that time, KZRH broadcasts were in the English language.

During the outbreak of the Second World War, the Imperial Japanese troops took over the stations and KZRH was rebranded PIAM ("Philippine Islands AM"), becoming a tool for the Second Republic's propaganda.

The birth of MBC; expansion of DZRH
After World War II, the Elizalde brothers (Federico "Fred", Joaquin Miguel "Mike" and Manuel "Manolo") took over KZRH and KZRC. With the help of station manager Bertrand Silen, KZRH transferred its operations to the Insular Life Building in Plaza Cervantes. In June 1946, the Elizaldes established the country's pioneer radio network, Metropolitan Broadcasting Corporation (which would be later known as the Manila Broadcasting Company), with KZRH as its flagship station.

KZRH returned to the airwaves on July 1, 1946. On July 4, 1946, it aired the live coverage of the Philippine independence from the United States and the inauguration of the third Philippine Republic. With this, the station switched to Filipino-language broadcasts and this followed by other radio stations.

In 1948, after the international telecommunications conference in the United States where the Philippines changed its first letter to "D", signaling the separation from the American broadcasting milieu. This prompted KZRH changed its callsign to DZRH, and has been expanded to over 30 stations nationwide on medium wave and shortwave frequencies. The same year, MBC launched its sister station in Manila, DZMB and DZPI.

In 1949, DZRH began airing the first radio drama, Gulong ng Palad ("Wheel of Fortune"). Radio drama is one of the traditions of Philippine radio before the rise of television industry and continues until today this time on the FM band (only Ito ang Palad Ko !, "This is my fate", one of the longest-running drama anthology series since 1973).

Martial Law era
In 1972, when then-President Ferdinand Marcos declared Martial Law, DZRH was temporarily closed for a few months. It was reopened but only under strict government censorship. It was the only other time in DZRH's history since the Second World War that the station's broadcast operations were interrupted. Upon resumption of broadcasts, DZRH (along with sister stations DZMB and DZPI) gained a new studio complex at North Bay Boulevard, Navotas and San Francisco del Monte, Quezon City.

In November 1978, DZRH migrated from 650 kHz to the current frequency at 666 kHz due to the switch of the Philippine AM bandplans from the NARBA-mandated 10 kHz spacing to the 9 kHz rule implemented by the Geneva Frequency Plan of 1975. In the same year, DZRH launched Operation Tulong ("Help"), a socio-civic organization that helps the people in time of need.

In February 1986, the station covered the controversial snap elections and the ensuing People Power Revolution that peacefully deposed President Marcos and President Corazon Aquino's eventual accession.

Post-People Power Revolution
In 1988, DZRH moved from the former studio in Quezon City to its new studio location at FJE Building, Esteban Street, Legazpi Village, Makati.

In 1989, DZRH celebrated its 50th (golden) anniversary by launching "50 Taon ng Radyo" on July 23. Ceremonies and events were held at Rizal Memorial Stadium and Araneta Coliseum included parades, games, concerts, as well as outdoor and indoor fireworks displays.

In 1991, radio veteran Joe Taruc joined the station, where he hosted Damdaming Bayan which is now the longest-running public affairs program, as well as a morning newscast. Aside from being a newscaster, he was also station manager, and later, Senior Vice-President until his death in September 2017.

In 1994, as part of their 55th anniversary, DZRH launched its own nationwide satellite radio broadcast reaching 97% of the Philippine populace. Thus, the slogan is "One Nation, One Station"; and at the same time, DZRH became the first AM station to broadcast in full AM stereo signal, equipped with an upgraded 50,000 watt solid-state digital transmitter. It also bought some of the broadcast veterans such as Jay Sonza, Rey Langit and Ka Louie Beltran.

In July 2002, DZRH, along with other MBC stations, transferred from FJE Building in Makati, to its current studios at MBC Building, Vicente Sotto Street, CCP Complex on Roxas Boulevard, Pasay.

In October 2007, DZRH once again ventured into television broadcasting with the launch of DZRH RadyoVision (which is not related to the now-defunct VHF TV station DZRH-TV Channel 11), which was renamed RHTV in 2008 and DZRH News Television in 2013. It is also the first cable channel to broadcast via Facebook Live by mirroring the live stream of DZRH News Television to the Facebook servers.

In 2009, DZRH celebrated its 70th anniversary by launching "Fiesta Sitenta" as well as the launch of its first-ever theme song commissioned for the station. In the final quarter of 2011, DZRH did changes in their programming line-up as well as the adoption of the new slogan "RH Agad!". In 2012, DZRH launched its new slogan, "Ang Makabagong Bayanihan" and also includes the theme song of the station (still heard in the station IDs of the station up to this day).

DZRH celebrated its Diamond Jubilee on July 15, 2014, at the Manila Hotel with the launching of the coffee-table book and the special commemorative stamp courtesy of PhilPost. In 2015, DZRH celebrated its 76th anniversary with the theme 76 Taon ng Balita at Serbisyo. In 2016, DZRH celebrated its 77th anniversary with the theme "77 Years: Serbisyong tapat sa inyo". In 2017, DZRH celebrated its 78th anniversary with the theme "78 taon ng Tamang Balita at Tamang Serbisyo sa Bawat Pilipino". In 2018, DZRH celebrated its 79th anniversary with the theme "Walong Dekada ng Tamang Pagbabalita at Tamang Paglilingkod" .

In October 2018, DZRH again aired its classic top-of-the-hour ID (which was launched on January 1, 1999, featuring the voice of Nick de Guzman) on a one-off airing basis, although the 2012 "Ang Makabagong Bayanihan" station ID continues to air on a regular basis. On the same month, DZRH reused its old slogan, "DZRH: Ang Kaunaunahan sa Pilipinas" in preparations for the 80th anniversary of the station in 2019. The said classic top-of-the-hour ID was re-introduced and became permanent in 2022, during the 83rd anniversary of the station.

On October 2, 2019, the studios of DZRH in the MBC Building, along with its sister MBC Manila radio stations, were affected by a major fire that originated in the nearby Star City theme park, prompting the station to suspend regular programming. In the interim, DZRH broadcasts from its backup studio in BSA Twin Towers, where the transmitters of its FM counterparts are located, where it played automated music throughout the day. Regular programming resumed the following day (October 3) at 4 am, with video streaming for the station's social media accounts and simulcast nationwide satellite relay feed restored later; but the audio live streaming and DZRH News Television channel for cable, DTH and regional digital TV remained off air until November 26 only on TV. On November 11, DZRH moved its studio at Design Center of the Philippines which is near the MBC Building.

In March 2020, DZRH temporarily suspended its regular programming, especially radio dramas and DZRH News Television programs, in line with the enhanced community quarantine imposed by President Rodrigo Duterte due to the COVID-19 pandemic, which replaced them with news updates; radio dramas would again return to the station after a few months of hiatus.

On November 15, 2021, DZRH alongside sister stations has launched their new logos and its new corporate slogan, Sama-Sama Tayo, Pilipino! ((). The station retained its interim studios at the Design Center of the Philippines which is near the MBC Building until December 16, 2021. On December 17, 2021, DZRH returned to the MBC Building with new brand new studios for both radio and TV operations.

Programming

Notable on-air personalities

 Anthony Taberna
 Sec. Jesus Crispin Remulla
 Teodoro Locsin Jr.
 Sen. JV Ejercito
 Cory Quirino
 Arnolfo Teves Jr.

Ratings
As of Q4 2022, DZRH is the #1 most-listened to AM radio station (and #1 among news radio stations) in Metro Manila, based on a survey commissioned by Kantar Media Philippines and Kapisanan ng mga Brodkaster ng Pilipinas.

References

External links
Media Ownership Monitor Philippines  - Radio by VERA Files and Reporters Without Borders

See also 
 DZRH News Television

DZRH Nationwide stations
DZRH
Radio stations established in 1939
News and talk radio stations in the Philippines